The 1902 election for Mayor of Los Angeles took place on December 1, 1902. Incumbent Meredith P. Snyder was re-elected.

Results

References

External links
 Office of the City Clerk, City of Los Angeles

1902
1902 California elections
Los Angeles
1900s in Los Angeles